Springhill is a small community in County Dublin, Ireland. It is located at a T-junction in the parish of Garristown, Dublin.

History
It is said that Springhill got its name from a freshwater spring that was on the site. Much of the land was owned by the Monks family in olden times, but was gradually given away. However, the Monks family still owns part of the land. The oldest (and biggest) landmark in Springhill is likely the Ennis house, an affluent house on the eastern side of Springhill. Previously owned by the Ennis family, it was sold to the Rock family, who sympathetically renovated the 18th century Georgian farm house and then sold once again to yet another family then occupying it.

Architecture
Springhill is a tiny community, with around six tightly grouped houses. There are four houses on the main hill, all related on the Monks side. There are two semi-detached bungalows and a single detached bungalow on the upper part of the hill, with another detached bungalow on the lower part. Apart from this cluster are the aforementioned two-story Ennis house, a small cottage to the west, and another two-story down a lane beside the Ennis house. The hill has nice gardens, and is quite picturesque. Other than the Ennis house, nearby landmarks include the large Wyanstown House- a very wealthy edifice- and the nearby Grallagh graveyard.

Facilities
There are two main facilities in Springhill, a Montessori, as well as a stud farm featuring a racetrack. The latter is located north of Springhill, on the road to Garristown.

External links
Little Oak Tree Montessori
Springhill Stud and Equestrian Centre.
The Grallagh Cemetery
Wyanstown House

Places in Fingal
Articles on towns and villages in Ireland possibly missing Irish place names